Creating Destiny (lit: Creating Relations) is a 2009 South Korean romantic comedy television series based on the two-volume manhwa of the same title written by Choi Soo-jung and Hyun Go-woon. It aired on MBC from October 10, 2009 to January 24, 2010 on Saturdays and Sundays at 19:55 for 31 episodes.

Lead actors Eugene and Ki Tae-young fell in love while filming and married in 2011. When Eugene announced their engagement in a posting on her official fan site, she wrote, "The drama Creating Destiny actually created my beloved destiny."

Plot
Han Sang-eun immigrated to Australia with her family at a young age. After graduating from law school, she announces her plans to marry her American boyfriend Alex, a fellow attorney. But her father is strongly opposed to the match, because he has his heart set on her marrying Kim Yeo-joon, the son of his best friend who lives back in Korea. He orders her to meet the bachelor that they picked out for her before she goes ahead and marries Alex. Sang-eun finds herself exiled to Korea, where she reluctantly teams up with Yeo-joon, who is focused on his career and equally uninterested in marriage, to devise a plan that will allow them to avoid their impending wedlock.

Cast

Main characters
Eugene as Han Sang-eun
Ki Tae-young as Kim Yeo-joon
Kang Byul as Han Hyo-eun
Kim Jung-nan as Kim Yoon-hee
Clara Lee as Yoo Hye-rim
Jung Suk-won as Jung Gyu-hwan
Byun Woo-min as Kang Hae-sung
Ryu Sang-wook as Kang Se-won

Supporting characters
Han family
Kang Nam-gil as Han Kyung-tae
Im Hyun-sik as Yoon Seok-joo

Kim family
Hwang Eun-hye as Kim Jin-joo
Choi Sang-hoon as Kim Taek-soo
Yang Hee-kyung as Park Geum-ja
Ban Hyo-jung as Lee Ok-ran
Lee Jung-hoon as Park Bok-man

Shim family
Lee Hee-do as Shim Dae-hwan
Geum Bo-ra as Shin Jin-hee

Extended cast
Baek Jong-min as Min Chul-ho
Olivier as Alex
Park Soon-chun as Soo-jung
Yoon Joo-hee as Jung Seo-yeon

Awards
2009 MBC Drama Awards: Golden Acting Award, Veteran Actor - Kang Nam-gil

Notes

References

External links
Creating Destiny official MBC website 

Seeking Love at MBC Global Media

2009 South Korean television series debuts
2010 South Korean television series endings
MBC TV television dramas
South Korean romantic comedy television series